HMS Stirling Castle was a 70-gun third rate ship of the line of the Royal Navy, built at Chatham Dockyard to the 1733 proposals of the 1719 Establishment, and launched on 24 April 1742.

Whilst under the command of Captain Thomas Cooper, Stirling Castle took part in the Battle of Toulon on 11 February 1744. Stirling Castle was the lead ship in Rear-Admiral William Rowley's van division of Admiral Thomas Mathews' fleet that engaged the France-Spanish fleet. After the battle several officers were court-martialed, including Captain Cooper who appeared on 12 May at Port Mahon, where he was dismissed the service. He was immediately restored to his former rank and command however, as the charges against him were not deemed detrimental to either his professional honour or his ability as a sea officer.

On 15 April 1746, Stirling Castle captured the 24-gun frigate Volage. However,  Oriflamme recaptured her the day after.

She took part in the Battle of Havana in 1762.  Shortly afterwards Stirling Castle was declared unserviceable and was stripped and scuttled in the upper reaches of Havana harbour on 14 September 1762, on the orders of Admiral George Pocock.

Notes

References

Lavery, Brian (2003) The Ship of the Line - Volume 1: The development of the battlefleet 1650-1850. Conway Maritime Press. .
Michael Phillips. Stirling Castle (70) (1742). Michael Phillips' Ships of the Old Navy. Retrieved 9 August 2008.
 
 

Ships of the line of the Royal Navy
1742 ships
Maritime incidents in 1762